Ian Waugh Bruce CBE FRSA CCMI (born 21 April 1945) British charity leader, cause campaigner and academic. He is vice-president of the Royal National Institute of Blind People (RNIB). He is also the founder and president of the Centre for Charity Effectiveness at Bayes Business School (formerly Cass), City, University of London.

Education
He was educated at King Edward VI School, Southampton, at Central High School in Phoenix, Arizona, and at the University of Birmingham, where he obtained  a Bachelor's degree in Social Sciences.

Career 
 1983 – 2003, Director General, RNIB
 1991 – 2010, Director, Centre for Charity Effectiveness, Bayes Business School (formerly Cass), City University London
 2003 – present, Vice President, RNIB
 2010 – present, President, Centre for Charity Effectiveness, Bayes Business School (formerly Cass), City, University of London

Honours and awards
Bruce was awarded an honorary degree as Doctor of Social Sciences from the University of Birmingham in 1995.

He received a CBE in the 2004 Birthday Honours.

Personal life
He and his wife Tina live in Richmond, London where, until December 2017, he was Chair of The Richmond Society, of which he is now a patron.

Books

References

External links 
 Profile: Ian Bruce Bayes Business School (formerly Cass), City, University of London

1945 births
Living people
Academics of Bayes Business School
Academics of City, University of London
Alumni of the University of Birmingham
Commanders of the Order of the British Empire
English nonprofit executives
People educated at King Edward VI School, Southampton
Richmond, London